The Gurghiu  (Hungarian: Görgény-patak, German: Rosengraben) is a river in the Gurghiu Mountains, Mureș County, northern Romania. It is a left tributary of the river Mureș. It flows through the municipalities Ibăneşti, Hodac, Gurghiu and Solovăstru, and joins the Mureș in the town Reghin.

Tributaries
The following rivers are tributaries to the river Gurghiu (from source to mouth):

Left: Secuș, Sebeș, Șirod and Orșova
Right: Lăpușna, Neagra, Fâncel, Tisieu, Tireu, Isticeu and Cașva

References

Rivers of Romania
Rivers of Mureș County